Vedetta anti sommergibile (anti-submarine picket boat), commonly abbreviated as VAS and also known in Italy as VAS Baglietto (from the name of the shipyard that designed VAS and built a number of them), was a class of motor torpedo boats that served as coastal anti-submarine patrol boats in the Regia Marina (Italian Royal Navy) during World War II. Several boats that survived the war later served in the post-war  Italian Navy. 

The boats were officially classified as "anti-submarine patrol boats" and the first 30 boats were ordered by the Regia Marina at the Baglietto shipyards on 3 September 1941, entering service between March and November 1942.  

The concept had first appeared in World War I and by the 1940s similar boats served with the US Navy where they were known as the PT boats, and they also had their European analogues in the  German S-boots and the Royal Navy's Vosper and Fairmile MTBs. The VAS were in fact a roundabout development of the original S-boot, derived from the German-built Orjen-class torpedo boats  of the Royal Yugoslav Navy captured by the Italians after the Axis invasion of Yugoslavia.

For all that the VAS were derived from MTBs, they were ultimately far closer in performance and intended role to the British Fairmile B motor launch, being both far slower & more defensive in nature than true MTBs.

References

Motor torpedo boats of the Regia Marina
World War II naval ships of Italy
Cold War naval ships of Italy
Torpedo boats of the Cold War
Ships built in Italy